Pseudalsophis thomasi, or Thompson's racer, a species of snake in the family Colubridae. It is endemic to several islands in the Galápagos group.

Etymology 
The genus name Pseudalsophis comes from the name of a genus of Caribbean snakes Alsophis due to their superficial similarities, combined with the Greek word pseudo meaning false. The specific name is in honor of the herpetologist Robert A. Thomas.

Description 
Diurnal snakes, active throughout the day with the exception of hot midday hours. They can be found in rocky areas, deciduous forest, and dry grassland habitats. Foraging predators they feed on small animals such as lava lizards, geckos, and possibly invertebrates. Snakes are mildly venomous enough to endanger small prey items but not enough to harm a human. Thompson's Racers have no natural predators however they are preyed upon by introduced black rats.

Distribution 
Thompson's racer is endemic to the islands of Santiago, Bartolomé, and Rábida. Its total estimated range is approximately 459 km2 It is the more common of the two snake species found on Santiago and Rábida, the other being the much rarer Santiago racer. It is the only snake known to be present on Bartolomé.

References 

Colubrids
Fauna of Ecuador
Reptiles described in 2018